Donald Thomas Anderson FRS (born 29 December 1939 Eton, Berkshire) is an English zoologist, lecturer at King's College London, and Challis Professor of Biology at University of Sydney. He is currently based in Australia.

He married Joanne Claridge in 1960.

Awards
2001 A.O. Kowalevsky Medal

Works
Atlas of invertebrate anatomy, UNSW Press, 1996, 
Barnacles: structure, function, development and evolution, Springer, 1994, 
Embryology and phylogeny in annelids and arthropods, Pergamon Press, 1973, 
Invertebrate zoology, Editor Donald Thomas Anderson, Oxford University Press, 1998,

References

1939 births
Living people
Academics of King's College London
Academic staff of the University of Sydney
English zoologists
Fellows of the Royal Society
People from Eton, Berkshire